Jackson Seth Whipper (born June 27, 1949) is an American judge and politician. He was a member of the South Carolina House of Representatives from the 113th District, serving from 1995 to 2017. He is a member of the Democratic party. He resigned from the legislature in 2017 to become a magistrate judge in Charleston County.

His mother, Lucille Whipper, was also a representative.

References

1949 births
20th-century American lawyers
20th-century American politicians
21st-century American judges
21st-century American politicians
African-American state legislators in South Carolina
Living people
Democratic Party members of the South Carolina House of Representatives
South Carolina lawyers
20th-century African-American politicians
21st-century African-American politicians